The Palace of Justice, located in Bucharest, Romania, was designed by the architects Albert Ballu and Ion Mincu and built between 1890 and 1895. The foundation stone was laid by King Carol I of Romania on October 7, 1890. The façade of the building is adorned with several statues representing allegories: Law, Justice, Justice, Truth, Force, and Prudence; the statues are the work of sculptors Carol Storck and Frederic Storck.

Located on the banks of the Dâmbovița River, the palace houses the Bucharest Court of Appeal, the Sector 5 Court, 
the National Union of Romanian Bars, and the Bucharest Bar. Its last major restoration was between 2003 and 2006.

References

External links

Palaces in Bucharest
Historic monuments in Bucharest
Government buildings completed in 1895
Courthouses in Romania